Araeopidius is a genus of toe-winged beetles in the family Ptilodactylidae. There is one described species in Araeopidius, A. monachus.

References

Further reading

 

Byrrhoidea
Articles created by Qbugbot